The Diamond Stakes (Japanese ダイヤモンドステークス) is a Grade 3 horse race for Thoroughbreds aged four and over, run in February over a distance of 3400 metres on turf at Tokyo Racecourse.

The Diamond Stakes was first run in 1951 and has held Grade 3 status since 1984. In its early years, the race was usually run at Nakayama Racecourse and returned to that track in 1985, 1986 and 2003. It was usually run over 2600 metres, until 1964.

Winners since 2000

Earlier winners

 1984 - Dai Sekitai
 1985 - Hokkai Pegasus
 1986 - Trademark
 1987 - Dolsa Sport
 1988 - Dyna Breeze
 1989 - Slew O Dyna
 1990 - Slew O Dyna
 1991 - North Shuttle
 1992 - Mr Cyclennon
 1993 - Matikanetannhauser
 1994 - Sengoku Silver
 1995 - Air Dublin
 1996 - Yu Sensho
 1997 - Yu Sensho
 1998 - Yusei Top Run
 1999 - Tamamo Inazuma

See also
 Horse racing in Japan
 List of Japanese flat horse races

References

Turf races in Japan